Major General Jagath Dias, WWV, RWP, RSP, USP (born December 26, 1960) is a Sri Lankan general, who served as the Chief of Staff of the Sri Lanka Army. He was the General Officer Commanding,  57 Division and 56 Division. He was the Sri Lankan Deputy Ambassador to Germany, Switzerland and the Vatican.

Education 
Educated at Ananda College, he is a graduate of the National Defence College, India.

Military career 
Dias enlisted in the army after completing his schooling on 11 August 1980 under going officer training at the Sri Lanka Military Academy at Diyatalawa; and commissioned to the 1 Vijayabahu Infantry Regiment as a Second Lieutenant on 27 February 1982. Afterwards he received an Inter Regimental transfer to Gajaba Regiment and went on to serve as the Commanding Officer of the 10th Gajaba Battalion and later served the Officiating Commandant at the Regimental Headquarters of the Gajaba Regiment. He was promoted to the ranks of captain in 1986, major in 1994, lieutenant colonel in 1995 and had undertaken the Young Officers' Course, Senior Command Course, MCC Course, CIMIC Course and the Senior Crisis Management Seminar. 

In 2000 he was promoted to colonel and was appointed Officiating Commander of Special Forces Brigade and Officiating Commander, 516 Brigade till 2001. In 2001 he was appointed Officiating Inspector Infantry, Army Headquarters till 2003. He was promoted to brigadier in 2005 and major general on 18 February 2008.

During his military  career he held many appointments. The include; Adjutant General (2012–2014), Deputy Chief of Mission to the Sri Lanka Embassy in Berlin (2009–2011), General Officer Commanding 57 Division (2007–2009), General Officer Commanding 56 Division (2006–2007), Commander 233 Brigade (2005–2006), Commandant, Infantry Training Centre, Officiating Commander for 534 Brigade (2003–2004), Officiating Inspector Infantry, Army Headquarters (2001–2003), Officiating Commander, 516 Brigade (2000–2001), Coordinating Officer Ariyalai, Officiating Commander, 551 Brigade, Commander 553 Brigade, Officiating Colonel GS, Directorate of Operations, Army Headquarters, Officiating Commandant Gajaba Regiment Regimental Headquarters, Commanding Officer, 10 Gajaba Regiment and many other appointments.

Foreign assignments reported by the military include: Pakistan,
Qatar, Oman, US, India, Czech Republic, Turkey, China, Russian Federation,
Australia, Germany & South Korea.

Family
He is married to Sharanki and they have two sons and a daughter.

References 

Sinhalese military personnel
Sri Lankan Buddhists
Sri Lankan major generals
Living people
Alumni of Ananda College
1960 births
Gajaba Regiment officers